Ambasador Hotel is a hotel in central Niš, Serbia.

History
Opened in 1968, it is in the middle of the town center, and in front of the hotel is the Monument to the Liberators of Niš. The Niš Fortress can be found just across the river Nišava.

The Hotel has been closed in 2013. It was sold in 2016 to My Place Group for around 850,000 EUR. The renovation started in 2017 and the hotel was opened again in June 2019. It is not first 5 star hotel in Niš and Southeastern Serbia as have no swimming pool. The hotel has spa, turkish bath, conference rooms, parking and several restaurants.

References

Hotel buildings completed in 1968
Hotels in Serbia
Economy of Niš
Buildings and structures in Niš
1968 establishments in Yugoslavia
Yugoslav Serbian architecture